Edwin González (born 22 February 1982) is a Guatemalan football defender.

He appeared in one match was part of the Guatemala national football team for the 2011 CONCACAF Gold Cup.

References

1982 births
Living people
Guatemalan footballers
Guatemala international footballers
Association football defenders
2011 Copa Centroamericana players
2011 CONCACAF Gold Cup players
C.S.D. Municipal players